Carmichael Park is a multi-sport venue located at Boundary Street, Tingalpa, Queensland. It is home to Wynnum District SC, now known as Wynnum Wolves FC and the Wynnum Manly District Cricket Club (WMDCC) Sea Eagles.

Facilities

The grounds consist of eight fields. Five fields are fully floodlit and are used for Football by Wynnum District SC and 3 are used for Cricket by Wynnum Manly District Cricket Club (Bill Albury Oval, Ian Droney Oval and Wayne Broad Oval.

See also

Sport in Brisbane

References

External links 

Wynnum Wolves FC

Facebook:- WolvesFC

Instagram:- @wynnumwolvesfc

Twitter:- @WynnumWolvesFC

You Tube:- Wolves FC

TikTok:- @wynnumwolvesfc

Website:- https://wynnumwolvesfc.com.au

Soccer venues in Queensland
Sports venues in Queensland

Wynnum Manly District Cricket Club 

Facebook:- WynnumManlyCricketClub

Instagram:- wynnummanlycc

Twitter:- @wynnummanlycc

You Tube:- Seaeagles TV |Subscribe Now|

TikTok:- WynnumManlyCricket

LinkedIn:- Wynnum Manly District Cricket Club

Website:- http://seaeagles.qld.cricket.com.au/